SS United Group Oil & Gas Company Limited (SUG) is a company, claiming to be an oil trading company supplying petroleum products and "advanced energy technologies" in China, Russia, Japan, Thailand and Malaysia. The company described itself as a Hong Kong-based joint venture between SS United Oil & Gas Company  Ltd. and Saha Regal Best Company Ltd., a Thai investment company involved in infrastructure projects in Thailand and Indochina.

Formula One sponsor

Directly before the 2007 Australian Grand Prix it was announced that the company was title sponsor of the Super Aguri Formula One team. The company name SS United appeared on the rear wing of the cars.

SS United defaulted on sponsorship payments which caused cashflow problems for Super Aguri and forced them to seek alternative sponsors. In the same month the SS United website was closed.

On 6 May 2008, the Super Aguri F1 Team withdrew from the Formula One Championship, citing SS United's breach of contract as a major cause for the team's demise.

See also
 Energy in Hong Kong

References

Oil and gas companies of Hong Kong
Companies with year of establishment missing